The Alabama Soccer Association (ASA) is the governing body of soccer in the state of Alabama.

ASA also administers the Alabama Adult State Cup, which serves as a qualifying platform for Region III of the United States Adult Soccer Association for qualification into the U.S. Open Cup.

References

External links
 Alabama Soccer Association official site

State Soccer Associations
Soccer in Alabama
1980 establishments in Alabama
Organizations based in Alabama
Sports organizations established in 1980
Organizations based in Birmingham, Alabama